WWE Hall of Fame (2009) was the event which featured the introduction of the 10th class to the WWE Hall of Fame. The event was produced by World Wrestling Entertainment (WWE) on April 4, 2009 from the Toyota Center in Houston, Texas. The event took place the same weekend as WrestleMania 25. The event was hosted by Jerry Lawler and Todd Grisham. The ceremony aired later that evening on the USA Network. In March 2015 the ceremony was added to the WWE Network.

Inductees

Individual
 Class headliners appear in boldface

Groups

References

WWE Hall of Fame ceremonies
2009 in professional wrestling
Professional wrestling in Houston
Events in Houston
2009 in Texas
April 2009 events in the United States